The Obélisque d'Arles ("Arles Obelisk") is a 4th-century Roman obelisk, erected in the center of the Place de la République, in front of the town hall of Arles, France.

Description
The obelisk is made of granite from Asia Minor. It does not feature any inscription. Its height together with its pedestal is approximately 20 m.

History

The obelisk was first erected under the Roman emperor Constantine II in the center of the spina of the Roman circus of Arles. After the circus was abandoned in the 6th century, the obelisk fell down and was broken in two parts. It was rediscovered in the 14th century and re-erected on top of a pedestal soon surmounted by a bronze globe and sun on 26 March 1676.

Designed by Jacques Peytret, these ornaments changed in times of political regimes. During the Revolution, the sun was replaced by a Phrygian cap; under the Empire, the eagle replaced the cap; under Louis-Philippe, the royal sun took the place of the rooster hunting the eagle. Since 1866, the ornaments were permanently removed and replaced by a bronze capstone until a fountain and the sculptures around it were designed by Antoine Laurent Dantan in the 19th century.

Conservation
This obelisk was listed on the 1840 inventory of historic sites in France. It is part of a 1981-designated UNESCO World Heritage Site, the Arles, Roman and Romanesque Monuments.

See also
List of World Heritage Sites in Europe

References

External links

Patrimony of the city of Arles: Obelisk 
1909 detailed text about the Obélisque d'Arles (.pdf document) 
Photo of the Obelisk, at Flickr
Obelisk of Arles 
Page about the Roman circus of Arles 
Another page about the Roman circus 

Roman Arles
Arles
Monuments historiques of Bouches-du-Rhône
Buildings and structures in Bouches-du-Rhône
Tourist attractions in Bouches-du-Rhône
4th-century establishments in Roman Gaul
Buildings and structures completed in the 4th century
Sculptures of lions